Fimleikafélagið Björk, also known as Björk for short, is a multi-sports club from Hafnarfjörður, Iceland. The club was founded in 1951 as a gymnastics club but soon started departments in various other sports.

Arena
In April 2001, ground was broken for the club's new arena, Bjarkarhús.

Sports

Basketball
During the winter of 1958–1959, the club started a basketball department. The following winter, basketball was the main sport at the club, with the gymnastic department folding. In 1963, the club won a junior women's national championship in 2. flokkur kvenna. The club competed in the top-tier Icelandic women's basketball tournament for the first and only time in 1964, finishing third.

References

Basketball teams in Iceland
Basketball teams established in 1964
Multi-sport clubs in Iceland